Sherry Dutzy is an American politician. She is a member of the New Hampshire House of Representatives, where she represents Ward 3 of the city of Nashua, New Hampshire. She is a Democrat.

Political career
Dutzy was elected in 2018 as part of the Democratic blue wave that swept the United States, including New Hampshire.

In 2019, Dutzy voted in favor of HB 564, a gun control law that bans firearms being carried on public school property in New Hampshire.

She endorsed Michael Bennet during the 2020 democratic primaries.

References

Democratic Party members of the New Hampshire House of Representatives
21st-century American women politicians
21st-century American politicians
Year of birth missing (living people)
Living people